Shaw High School is a public high school in East Cleveland, Ohio, United States. It is the only high school in the East Cleveland City School District and serves approximately 630 students in grades 9 through 12. The current Shaw facility was constructed around 2007.  Larry Ellis is the principal. Athletic teams are known as the Cardinals and the school colors are red and black.

Arts
The school's marching band, the Mighty Cardinal Marching Band, performs at various events throughout the year in and around Cleveland, along with home football games at historic Shaw Stadium. In 2008, they traveled to China after being selected to perform at ceremonies for the 2008 Beijing Summer Olympics.

State championships
 Baseball  1944, 1968
 Boys track and field  1915, 1916, 1919

Notable alumni

 Jim Backus, actor
 Denayne Davidson-Dixon, professional football player in the Arena Football League
 Wayne Dawson, television news anchor
 Erwin Griswold, served as dean of Harvard Law School for 21 years
 Clare Grundman, composer for bands
 John Henton, actor/comedian
 Bob Kelly, professional baseball player in Major League Baseball (MLB)
 Buzzy Linhart, musician, songwriter, actor
 Joe Little III, singer-songwriter
 Tom Matte, professional football player in the National Football League (NFL)
 Ruth McKenney, author
 Eric Moten, professional football player in the NFL
 Eleanor Parker, actress 
 Art Sansom, cartoonist
 Buddy Schultz, professional baseball player in MLB
 Darryl Talley, professional football player in the NFL

References

External links
 

High schools in Cuyahoga County, Ohio
Public high schools in Ohio
East Cleveland, Ohio